Berytidae is a family of the order Hemiptera ("true bugs"), commonly called stilt bugs or thread bugs. Most berytids are brown to yellow, with species that are plant sap feeders, a few being predaceous. About 200 species are known from all around the world and they are classified into three subfamilies.

Description

The Berytidae are extremely gracile insects with legs so long and slender as to suggest common names such as "thread bugs" and "stilt bugs". In this they resemble the Emesinae, with which they are easily confused, though they are in different families. They may be distinguished most readily by the forelegs, that in the Emesinae are raptorial in a way resembling those of the Mantodea, Mantispidae and certain other invertebrate predators. In form and function the forelegs of the Berytidae are roughly similar to those of their other legs. Other differences are subtler and not fully consistent. For one thing, the antennae of most Berytidae though long, geniculate, and in other ways generally similar to Emesinae, tend to have a more or less obvious swelling at the tip. Some members of the family also have slight swellings at the distal ends of the femora of their legs, though in many species this is either absent or not obvious. The head often has a forward-facing protrusion between the antennae bases. The wing membrane has five veins and can be hard to examine in short-winged forms. Some species have spine like protrusions emerging at the base of the forewings which have a pore through which chemicals are secreted. Many species have split or toothed claws which apparently allow, along with the long legs, these bugs to overcome plant defenses involving stick hair on their surfaces. Many species are not purely plant-sap feeding and will opportunistically scavenge on insects trapped on the surfaces of sticky-haired plants. They typically probe all surfaces and can inflict a painful prick on the human skin as well.

Biology
The habits of most species are not well known. Most are believed to be sap-suckers like most other Hemiptera, but some also feed on mites and small insects.

Subfamilies and selected genera
Three subfamilies are usually recognised:

Berytinae
tribe Berytini 
 Apoplymus Fieber, 1859
 Arideneides Tatarnic, 2022
 Bezu Stusak, 1989
 Chinoneides Stusak, 1989
 Neides Latreille, 1802
 Neoneides Stusak, 1989
 Yemmatropis Hsiao, 1977
tribe Berytinini 
 Berytinus Kirkaldy, 1900

Gampsocorinae

 Bajacanthus Henry & Wall, 2019
 Gampsocoris Fuss, 1852
 Hoplinus Stal, 1874
 Pronotacantha Uhler, 1893

Metacanthinae

 Capyella Breddin, 1907
 Jalysus Stal, 1862
 Metacanthus Costa, 1847
 Metatropis Fieber, 1859
 Yemma Horvath, 1905

Unplaced genera
 Acanthophysa Uhler, 1893
 Aknisus McAtee, 1919
 Protacanthus Uhler, 1894
 Paleologus Distant, 1902

Gallery

References

 
Heteroptera families
Articles containing video clips